was a town located in Kaifu District, Tokushima, Japan.

As of 2003, the town had an estimated population of 2,423 and a density of 91.92 persons per km². The total area was 26.36 km².

On March 31, 2006, Kaifu, with the towns of Kainan and Shishikui (all from Kaifu District), was merged to create the town of Kaiyō.

External links
 Kaiyō official website (in Japanese)

Dissolved municipalities of Tokushima Prefecture
Kaiyō, Tokushima